Victorino Abente y Lago (June 2, 1846 in Muxía, Spain – December 22, 1935 in Asunción, Paraguay) was a Paraguayan poet. 
He went to Paraguay when resentments of the Paraguayan War (1864–1870) were still fresh. 
In spite of being Galician, his life and work identifies with the Paraguay since the very moment of his arrival in March 1869, when the Brazilian and Argentine troops occupied the country.

First steps 

He was related with the second stage of the Paraguayan romanticism that begun after the War Against the Triple Alliance, and even with the post-romanticism. Also collaborated with many journals of the capital, where he published many of his own poems. His poems were dedicated to the renaissance of the nation, being properly known as the "poet of the national resurrection". A few months before his decease could watch his country victorious in the war against Bolivia between 1932 and 1935.

Career 

His poems, spread on many journals and magazines of his time, were recompiled and published after his decease in Asunción by his grandson Cándido Samaniego Abente in a book entitled Poetic Anthology: 1867-1926, in 1984.

About his work, Ignacio A. Pane wrote: "He sang the most beautiful, passionate, enthusiastic and poetic song in just one word that until now writers and teachers have been directing the Paraguay... Taken by the wings of his own inspiration he made that the 'Paraguayan Sibyl' stood firm and tended the pointer finger of the prophet to show him the Promised Land..."

Last years 

Married with Isabel Miskowsky, Victorino Juan Ramón Abente y Lago deceased in Asunción, December 22, 1935.

References 
Centro Cultural de la República
Diccionario Biográfico "FORJADORES DEL PARAGUAY", Primera Edición Enero de 2000. Distribuidora Quevedo de Ediciones. Buenos Aires, Argentina.

External links 
Literatura paraguaya

1846 births
1935 deaths
People from the Province of A Coruña
20th-century Paraguayan poets
Paraguayan male poets
Spanish emigrants to Paraguay
Paraguayan people of Galician descent
19th-century Paraguayan poets
19th-century male writers
20th-century male writers